Schidlovsky's vole (Microtus schidlovskii) is a species of rodent in the family Cricetidae. It is normally found in northwestern Armenia, and was long considered a subspecies of the social vole until relisted as a species by Golenishchev in 2002.

References

D.E. Wilson & D.M. Reeder, 2005: Mammal Species of the World: A Taxonomic and Geographic Reference. Third Edition. The Johns Hopkins University Press, Baltimore

Microtus
Mammals described in 1933